Gargee Roychowdhury is an Indian actress. She works in Bengali movies in Tollywood and serials in television. Gargi Roychowdhury is one of the popular actresses of the Bengali screen. She began her career as a theatre artist, performing in Uttaran and later Bohurupee. She has also been a newscaster and radio artist. She is an alumnus of Patha Bhavan, Kolkata.

Career
Gargee Roychowdhury rose to fame for the Bengali long running soap opera Sisirer Sabdo Sona Jai, in which she played a lawyer

Filmography

Recent works
Gargee Roychowdhury was in the news for her performance in the movie Ramdhanu - The Rainbow. It also starred Shiboprosad Mukherjee, Rachna Banerjee, Kharaj Mukherjee. She also played the role of Reena Sen in the film Naxal. In 2017 she starred in Anik Dutta's movie Meghnad Badh Rahasya. She also made popularity by acting in Shiboprosad Mukherjee's film Haami (2018).

Advertisement
Roychowdhury has been featured in the Bengali version of the latest Horlicks advertisement.

External links

References

Bengali actresses
Living people
Actresses from Kolkata
21st-century Indian actresses
Actresses in Bengali cinema
Indian television actresses
Indian film actresses
Year of birth missing (living people)